The United States District Court for the District of North Dakota (in case citations, D.N.D.) is the United States District Court or the Federal district court, whose jurisdiction is the state of North Dakota. The court is headquartered out of Bismarck at the William L. Guy Federal Building and has additional locations at Fargo, Grand Forks, and Minot. Appeals from the Court are heard by the United States Court of Appeals for the Eighth Circuit (except for patent claims and claims against the U.S. government under the Tucker Act, which are appealed to the Federal Circuit).

The district was created in 1889, when the Dakota Territory was divided into North Dakota and South Dakota.  The Grand Forks courts are located at the Ronald N. Davies Federal Building and U.S. Courthouse. In 1921, a second temporary judgeship was authorized, however, this was never made permanent and the judgeship expired in 1928. In 1954, a second permanent judgeship was authorized, and the strength of the court has remained unchanged since.

The United States Attorney's Office for the District of North Dakota represents the United States in civil and criminal litigation in the court. , the United States Attorney for the District of North Dakota is Mac Schneider.

Current judges 
:

Former judges

Chief judges

Succession of seats

See also 
 Courts of North Dakota
 List of current United States district judges
 List of United States federal courthouses in North Dakota

References

External links 
 United States District Court for the District of North Dakota Official Website
 United States Attorney for the District of North Dakota Official Website

North Dakota law
North D
1889 establishments in North Dakota
Courthouses in North Dakota
Bismarck, North Dakota
Fargo, North Dakota
Courts and tribunals established in 1889